John Abbott (born 15 February 1953 in Innisfail, Queensland) is an Australian former professional rugby league footballer who played in the 1970s. He played in the New South Wales Rugby Football League premiership for the Canterbury-Bankstown club and in the Brisbane Rugby League premiership for the Eastern Suburbs club, winning grand finals with them in 1977 and 1978. He played predominantly as a second row forward.

References

External links
Bulldogs profile

1953 births
Living people
Canterbury-Bankstown Bulldogs players
Eastern Suburbs Tigers players
Fortitude Valley Diehards players
Rugby league players from Innisfail, Queensland
Rugby league second-rows